Garhwali may refer to:

 Garhwali people, an ethno-linguistic group who live in northern India
 Garhwali language, the Indo-Aryan language spoken by Garhwali people
 anything from or related to:
Garhwal division, a region in state of Uttarakhand, India
Garhwal Kingdom, a former princely state in what is now Uttarakhand, India
Garhwal (disambiguation), for other uses
 The soldier of the Indian Army regiment The Garhwal Rifles

See also
Garhwal (disambiguation) 

Language and nationality disambiguation pages